Judge Woodward may refer to:

Charles Edgar Woodward (1876–1942), judge of the United States District Court for the Northern District of Illinois
Halbert Owen Woodward (1918–2000), judge of the United States District Court for the Northern District of Texas

See also
Justice Woodward (disambiguation)